The following is the qualification system and qualified athletes for the swimming at the 2019 Pan American Games competitions.

Qualification system
A total of 350 swimmers will qualify in the pool and a total of 40 additional open water swimmers will qualify as well. As Host Country, Peru automatically will qualify 18 male and 18 female competitors in the pool. Each National Olympic Comitte (NOC) may use proven swim times attained during the qualification
period of those swimmers who have met the qualifying standards established by the UANA for the 2019 Pan American Games at a competition recognized by the FINA from the official list of approved qualifying competitions for the 18th FINA World Aquatics Championships held in Gwangju, Korea. Each event (besides the relays) have an A standard (two entries allowed) or a B standard (one entry allowed). Countries not qualified can enter one male and one female swimmer through the universality rule. In open water, Canada and the USA automatically qualify two per gender, with eight spots being awarded in each gender to CONSANAT and CCCAN.

Swimming qualification times
The time standards (all long course) for the 2019 Pan American Games are:

Swimming
A total of 37 countries qualified swimmers or received universality spots. Only 326 of 350 quota spots were distributed. A total of 167 male swimmers and 159 swimmers were entered.

Open water swimming

Qualification timeline

Summary

Qualified swimmers
The following countries earned quotas:

References

P
Qualification for the 2019 Pan American Games
Swimming at the 2019 Pan American Games